Mycerinus may refer to:

Mycerinus (beetle), a genus of longhorn beetles
Mycerinus (plant), a genus of Ericaceae
The Greek name of the Egyptian pharaoh Menkaure